A bear pit was historically used to display bears, typically for entertainment and especially bear-baiting. The pit area was normally surrounded by a high fence, above which the spectators would look down on the bears.

The most traditional form of maintaining bears in captivity is keeping them in pits, although many zoos replaced these by more elaborate and spacious enclosures that attempt to replicate their natural habitats, for the benefit of the animals and the visitors.

A noteworthy example is found in Bern, Switzerland. Known as the Bärengraben, it was built in 1857, and is still in use though much modified:  after an outcry around 2000, when the bears were still in two circular pits and shut up at night, a park was constructed on the riverbank by the pits with generous access to the river Aare which has greatly improved the three bears' accommodation.

Other meanings 
Another meaning is for an unusually aggressive political arena, in which direct, heated attacks are common.

A bear pit also refers to a type of trap used to deter or trap bears.  It usually consists of a large earthen pit with sharpened pikes in the bottom to impale the bear.  They are most often used to deter bears from approaching a cabin, rather than as a means of actually catching them.

The term bear pit is also used to describe a tournament or sparring format, sometimes also referred to as "king of the hill". The participants form a queue behind the first two to compete. Once each match is over, the winner remains to face the next opponent in line, while the loser goes to the end of the queue. For tournaments, it is usual that the process is continued for a set period of time during which the victor of each match is noted. At the end of the tournament the winner is determined to be the contestant that won the most matches. Multiple bear pits may also be employed, with defeated contestants able to choose which queue to re-enter.

In Scotland, the phrase bear pit is used to describe bars or public houses that are known to have a violent reputation.

See also 
 Berenkuil (traffic)
 Menagerie
 Zoo

References

External links 
 Sheffield Botanical Gardens Bear Pit
 Bear parc in Bern

Bears
Zoos
Baiting (blood sport)
Cruelty to animals

es:Foso del oso